Andre Odendaal (born 14 October 1994) is a Zimbabwean cricketer. He made his first-class debut on 18 March 2021, for Rocks, in the 2020–21 Logan Cup. Prior to his first-class debut, he was named in Zimbabwe's squad for the 2012 Under-19 Cricket World Cup. He made his Twenty20 debut on 11 April 2021, for Rocks, in the 2020–21 Zimbabwe Domestic Twenty20 Competition.

References

External links
 

1994 births
Living people
Zimbabwean cricketers
Southern Rocks cricketers
Place of birth missing (living people)